Donaghmore/Ashbourne GAA is a Gaelic Athletic Association club located in the town of Ashbourne in County Meath, Ireland. The club competes in Meath competitions. The team was founded in 1923 under the name Donaghmore but was renamed Donaghmore/Ashbourne in 1996 to reflect the increased number of players and supporters from Ashbourne. The club has won 3 Meath Senior Football Championship.

History
The club was founded under the name Donaghmore in 1923 in the townland 3 km south of Ashbourne. The club won three Senior Football Championships in 1927, 1928 and 1942. In more recent times the club has had success at Junior and Intermediate levels and currently has 45 teams competing at Football, Hurling, Ladies Football and Camogie.

Notable players
 Bryan Menton
 Andrew Tormey
 Colm Ó Méalóid

Ned Durnin All Ireland winner in 1954 with Meath, Eugene Hickey and Timmy O Regan Leinster Junior Winners - Mort Sullivan U21 Leinster winner, Bryan Menton minor leinster championship (2008) and senior leinster championship (2010). Eoin Reilly, Andrew Tormey, David Morgan and Cormac McGill.

Honours
Meath Senior Football Championship: 3
1927, 1928, 1942
Meath Intermediate Football Championship: 4
1938, 1950, 1959, 2007
 Meath Minor Football Championship: 4
 2006, 2007, 2008, 2013
Feis Cup Winners: 5
1938, 1950, 1959, 2016, 2017
Meath Intermediate Hurling Championship: 1
1976
Meath Junior Hurling Championship: 2
1974, 1994
Meath Junior 2 Hurling Championship: 2
1989, 2009
Meath Intermediate Camogie Championship: 1
2010

External links
Club website

Gaelic games clubs in County Meath